Yuan Tze-yu is a Taiwanese politician. She currently serves as the Deputy Secretary-General of the Examination Yuan.

Education
Yuan obtained her bachelor's degree from the Department of Mass Communication of Fu Jen Catholic University and her master's degree from the Department of Advertising of University of Texas at Austin in the United States.

Political career
She served as a specialist at the Government Information Office, deputy director of the Department of Foreign Affairs of the Taiwan Provincial Government and counselor and director of the third division of the Research and Development Committee of the Examination Yuan, before stepping into her current position as Deputy Secretary-General of the Examination Yuan.

See also
 Examination Yuan

References

Living people
Political office-holders in the Republic of China on Taiwan
Fu Jen Catholic University alumni
University of Texas at Austin alumni
Year of birth missing (living people)